General elections were held in Nicaragua on 2 November 1912 to elect a president and Constitutional Assembly. The presidential elections were won by Adolfo Díaz of the Conservative Party, although neither of the two opposition candidates were official. The Liberal Party did not contest the elections due to pressure from the United States.

Results

President

References

Nicaragua
1912 in Nicaragua
Elections in Nicaragua
Presidential elections in Nicaragua
November 1912 events
Election and referendum articles with incomplete results